Natalya Goncharova (born 28 July 1974) is a Kazakhstani fencer. She competed in the women's individual épée event at the 2000 Summer Olympics.

References

External links
 

1974 births
Living people
Kazakhstani female épée fencers
Olympic fencers of Kazakhstan
Fencers at the 2000 Summer Olympics
Sportspeople from Almaty
Fencers at the 2002 Asian Games
Asian Games competitors for Kazakhstan